Emily Hancock may refer to:

Emily Hancock Siedeberg (1873–1968), New Zealand doctor and medical administrator
Emily Hancock (Neighbours), a fictional character from Australian soap opera Neighbours